The Water Gipsies may refer to:

 The Water Gipsies (novel), a 1930 British novel by A. P. Herbert
 The Water Gipsies (film), a 1932 British film adaptation directed by Maurice Elvey
 The Water Gipsies (musical), a 1955 stage version by A. P. Herbert and Vivian Ellis

See also
 Sea Gypsies (disambiguation)